The San Carlos Formation is a geological formation in west Texas whose strata date back to the Late Cretaceous. Dinosaur remains are among the fossils that have been recovered from the formation.

Vertebrate paleofauna
 Gryposaurus sp
 Kritosaurus sp (Gryposaurus sp)
 Stegoceras sp
 Deinosuchus sp

See also

 List of dinosaur-bearing rock formations

References

External links 

Campanian Stage
Cretaceous geology of Texas
Geologic formations of Texas